The XXXIV Golden Grand Prix Ivan Yarygin 2023, also known as Ivan Yarygin (Yariguin) 2023 is a freestyle wrestling international tournament, which will be held in Krasnoyarsk, Russia between 26 and 29 January 2022.

Event videos
The event will air freely on the wrestlingtv.ru channel.

Medal table

Medal overview

Men's freestyle

Women's freestyle

References 

Golden Grand Prix Ivan Yarygin
Golden Grand Prix Ivan Yarygin
2023 in sport wrestling